Indranil Manohar Naik is a leader of Nationalist Congress Party and a member of the Maharashtra Legislative Assembly elected from Pusad Assembly constituency He is nephew of former Chief Minister of Maharashtra Sudhakarrao Naik & He is Grandson of former Chief Minister of Maharashtra Vasantrao Naik

Positions held
 2019: Elected to Maharashtra Legislative Assembly.

References

Living people
Nationalist Congress Party politicians from Maharashtra
People from Yavatmal
Maharashtra MLAs 2019–2024

Year of birth missing (living people)